Jeena Isi Ka Naam Hai was an Indian talk show hosted initially by Bollywood actor Farooq Shaikh and later by Bollywood actor Suresh Oberoi. It premiered on 22 March 2002, and due to the success of its first season, the show reappeared on Zee TV channel on 7 October 2006.

The show featured interviews of Bollywood personalities and other Indian celebrities.

Hosts 

Farooq Shaikh and Suresh Oberoi (Season 1)
Roshan Abbas (Season 2)

Celebrity guest appearance

Season 1

Season 2

References

External links
Jeena Isi Ka Naam Hai Site on Zee TV

Zee TV original programming
2002 Indian television series debuts
2008 Indian television series endings
Indian television series